The Mole: Undercover in North Korea is a 2020 documentary miniseries written and directed by Mads Brügger.

The series follows Ulrich Larsen, called "the Mole", a former chef living on benefits who spends 10 years infiltrating the Korean Friendship Association (KFA). He quickly rises through the ranks and gains the trust of KFA leader Alejandro Cao de Benós from Spain. Cao de Benós tells the Mole that he is looking for possible investors that are willing to invest in North Korea, despite sanctions against the country. Brügger decides to inject into the story a "Mr James" (Jim Latrache-Qvortrup), pretending to be a possible investor.

After a meeting with Cao de Benós about possible sale of drugs and weapons from North Korea, the Mole and Mr. James travel to North Korea, where they sign a contract with North Korea to produce drugs and weapons in another country. Mr James meets the North Koreans officials again in Uganda, where they discuss buying an island in Lake Victoria in Uganda to construct an underground drugs and weapons manufactory, under the disguise of establishing a luxury hotel.

People

The Mole / Ulrich Larsen 
Ulrich Larsen is a former chef, who was forced to retire early due to chronic inflammation in the pancreas, and now lives on government benefits. He watched Brügger's documentary series Det Røde Kapel (The Red Chapel) about North Korea, and became interested in the country. Larsen then joined the Korean Friendship Association and contacted Brügger about his ventures. He started filming the meetings, officially to post them to social media, but with the real intention of offering them to Brügger should he be interested in making a sequel to Det Røde Kapel.

Larsen lives in a Copenhagen suburb with his wife and kids, who did not know about his 10-year-long double-life. He had only told his wife that he was in the friendship association out of curiosity, where he was traveling, but not what he did there, and that he was working with Brügger on a project where he "made fun of" Det Røde Kapel. When he told his wife about his true role, she said she thought he was an idiot, and that it was tough with the lies and the danger he put himself into, and the way he retracted from the family. In an October 2020 interview with DR in connection with the premier, Larsen said that he had become more vigilant, placing empty soda cans on door handles in hotels, so he is warned if anybody tries to enter.

Sam Wollaston of The Guardian describes him as "polite" and "unassuming", saying: "His unmemorable 44-year-old face is how I imagine an efit template might be, what you start with before you add distinguishing features. You get to decide who he is. Perfect for blending in."

Mr James / Jim Mehdi Latrache-Qvortrup 
The actor who played Mr James is Jim Mehdi Latrache-Qvortrup, a former French foreign legionnaire and convicted drug dealer.

Alejandro Cao de Benós 
The series features the Korean Friendship Association with its president Alejandro Cao de Benós. He claimed that he was just acting, playing along on Mr James' plans to deal weapons and drugs. In 2022, a federal arrest warrant was issued in the United States District Court, Southern District of New York, after he was charged with conspiracy to violate the International Emergency Economic Powers Act (IEEPA)

Annie Machon 
Annie Machon is a former MI5 intelligence officer and whistleblower who was drafted for her experience by Mads Brügger to debrief the Mole and Mr James.

Anders Kristensen 
The Danish president of Korean Friendship Association.

Production 
The documentary is produced by Wingman Media and Piraya Film, with DR, NRK, SVT and BBC Storyville being co-producers.

The documentary contains an actor playing "Mr James", who pretends to be an investor. Mr James, an agent provocateur, seems willing to do illicit deals involving narcotics and weapons.

Reception 

The documentary earned universal acclaim from Danish newspapers and publications. Politiken gave it five out of six hearts and described it as convincing and nerve-racking,
while Berlingske and Jyllands-Posten rated it five out of six stars and called it marvelously entertaining and extremely impressive, respectively.

Thomas Brunstrøm of Berlingske said that "even by Mads Brügger's standard, it's an insane story, with characters so colorful that if The Mole had been fiction, you would probably say it was too unrealistic."
 also rated it five out of six stars and praised Brügger as currently the most interesting Danish documentarian. Bo Tao Michaëlis of  rated it five out of six stars and wrote that it was brilliantly fascinating from beginning to end, describing it as a "007-movie without fast car chases and hot blondes" and applauding Brügger's decision to pair the anonymous Larsen with the former Foreign Legionary and criminal Latrache-Qvortrup. Norwegian newspaper Dagbladet gave it five out of six stars, writing that it's sensational and among the few documentaries explosive enough to change the world. The Guardian, The Telegraph and The Times described the documentary as extraordinary and absurdly brave.

Ola Kaldager, the former leader of the Intelligence Service of Norway's group E 14, said about Larsen's infiltration: "As an intelligence operation, this is one of the best I have seen."
Former coordinator of the UN Panel of Experts on North Korea, Hugh Griffiths said "This film is the most severe embarrassment to Chairman Kim Jong-un that we have ever seen."

Reactions 
The Swedish and Danish foreign ministers, Ann Linde and Jeppe Kofoed, announced on 12 October 2020 that they would bring the documentary to the attention of the UN Sanctions Committee, and also raise the issues in the European Union.

North Korea, from its embassy in Sweden, denied the allegations made in the documentary and called it a "fabrication".

On September 9, 2021, Chinese officials have said that investigators should not use the documentary as evidence for investigating violations on sanctions since the videos were made through illegitimate means.

References

External links
 

2020s Danish television series
2020 Danish television series debuts
2020 Danish television series endings
Works about North Korea